Nothing Butt... is an album by saxophonist Willis Jackson which was recorded in 1980 and first released on the Muse label in 1983.

Reception 

In his review on Allmusic, Scott Yanow states "Tenor saxophonist Willis Jackson got into a routine on his Muse albums, but never lost his enthusiasm and creativity within the genre ... An excellent effort full of enjoyable and fairly accessible music".

Track listing 
All compositions by Willis Jackson except where noted.
 "Just the Way You Are" (Billy Joel) – 7:06
 "Nuages" (Django Reinhardt) – 4:49
 "Nothing Butt" – 4:48
 "Hittin' and Missin'" – 8:00
 "Autumn Leaves" (Joseph Kosma, Jacques Prévert, Johnny Mercer) – 4:27
 "Move" (Denzil Best) – 4:01

Personnel 
Willis Jackson – tenor saxophone
Charles Earland – organ
Pat Martino – guitar
Grady Tate – drums

References 

Willis Jackson (saxophonist) albums
1983 albums
Muse Records albums
Albums recorded at Van Gelder Studio
Albums produced by Bob Porter (record producer)